HC Martigny was a Swiss professional ice hockey team, and played in the Swiss National League B. It merged with HC Verbier Val-de-Bagnes in 2008, to form HC Red Ice.

Founded: 1939
Home arena: Forum d'Octodure (capacity 4,500)
Swiss Championships won: 0
National League B Championships won: 0

External links
 hc-martigny.ch (inactive)

Ice hockey teams in Switzerland
Martigny